Ductor is an extinct genus of prehistoric ray-finned fish that lived from the early to middle Eocene.  Fossils are found in Monte Bolca.

In life, species of Ductor would have resembled pilot fish, though, they are more closely related to the jackfish.  Some experts place Ductor into its own family, "Ductoridae," while others place the genus within the closely related Carangidae.

See also

 Prehistoric fish
 List of prehistoric bony fish

References

Eocene fish
Fossils of Italy
Prehistoric perciform genera